The 2020 II liiga is the 26th season of the II liiga, fourth tier league for association football clubs in Estonia.

East/North

West/South

References

Football leagues in Estonia
4
Estonia
Estonia